Joe Harding (born June 18, 1987) is an American politician and businessman who served as a member of the Florida House of Representatives from 2020 until his resignation in 2022. A member of the Republican Party, Harding is most well known for introducing the Florida Parental Rights in Education Act, commonly known by opponents as the "Don't Say Gay" act.

Early life and education 
Harding was born and raised in Williston, Florida. He studied construction management at the College of Central Florida and Florida International University, but left both schools without receiving a degree.

Career 
Harding worked as a project manager in the construction industry for several years before founding Stripes Lawn Care in 2018. Harding was elected to the Florida House of Representatives in November 2020. He is a member of the House Education & Employment Committee.

In 2021, Harding introduced the controversial bill, Florida Parental Rights in Education Act, prohibiting teachers from discussing LGBT related topics in Kindergarten through 3rd grade school classrooms in Florida. In 2022, Harding offered an amendment to the bill requiring public schools to out gay children to their parents once the schools learn that the child is not heterosexual, which was later withdrawn. The legislation has been opposed by the American Bar Association, Equality Florida, and President Joe Biden.

Federal indictment
On December 7, 2022, Harding was indicted by a federal grand jury on six counts of wire fraud and money laundering related to a scheme to defraud the Small Business Administration of more than $150,000 in COVID-19-related small business loans. Harding was released on bond and has lost his committee assignments for the upcoming legislative term. Harding resigned on December 8, 2022.

A trial is scheduled for January 11, 2023, in Gainesville, Florida.

References 

1987 births
Living people
People from Levy County, Florida
College of Central Florida alumni
Florida International University alumni
Republican Party members of the Florida House of Representatives
Discrimination against LGBT people in the United States